Terrence Michael Donahue (June 24, 1944 – July 4, 2021) was an American football coach and executive. He served as the head coach at the University of California, Los Angeles (UCLA) from 1976 to 1995, compiling a record of 151–74–8. His 151 wins are the most in UCLA Bruins history, and his 98 wins in the Pac-10 Conference—now known as the Pac-12 Conference—remain the most in the conference's history. Donahue's Bruins won five Pac-10 titles and appeared in four Rose Bowls, winning three. He became the first head coach to win a bowl game in seven consecutive seasons.

Donahue played college football for UCLA as an undersized defensive tackle. He left coaching after the 1995 season to become a college football color commentator. Donahue was inducted into the College Football Hall of Fame as a coach in 2000. From 2001 to 2005, he was the general manager for the San Francisco 49ers of the National Football League (NFL).

Early life and playing career
Born in Los Angeles, Donahue attended St. Charles Borromeo Elementary School in North Hollywood, California, and graduated from Notre Dame High School in Sherman Oaks. After not being recruited in high school, he was a walk-on at San Jose State University, Los Angeles Valley College and then the University of California, Los Angeles. He played two seasons for the Bruins as an undersized ,  defensive tackle. His 1965 team was the school's first to win the Rose Bowl.

Coaching career
After graduating from UCLA with a bachelor's degree in history, Donahue became an assistant coach at the University of Kansas under Pepper Rodgers.  In 1971, he returned to UCLA when Rodgers became their head coach.  When Rodgers left, Donahue remained as an assistant under Dick Vermeil before succeeding Vermeil as the head coach in 1976. In the season opener, the Bruins won a nationally televised Thursday night game against No. 3-ranked Arizona State, and finished 9–2–1 in his first season. Sports Illustrated said Donahue, who was only in his early 30s, "may be the best young coach in the country." UCLA's best finish under Donahue was 10–1–1 in 1982, with his other 10-win seasons coming in 1987 and 1988 at 10–2.

In the final regular-season game of 1995, the Bruins defeated the USC Trojans, their fifth straight win against their crosstown rival. It was Donahue's 98th conference victory in the Pac-10, surpassing Don James for the most in the conference's history. Afterwards, Donahue announced that he would retire from coaching after their Aloha Bowl game to become a college football analyst with CBS. He has the most wins of any coach in UCLA football history (151). The Los Angeles Times attributed his coaching success to his being "a pioneer in national recruiting". His Bruins squads finished the season ranked in the top 20 on 12 occasions, including five times in the top 10 from 1982 though 1988, though he received some criticism for not winning a national championship. He coached 34 first-team All-Americans, and 14 UCLA players from his era were chosen in the first round of the NFL Draft.

Donahue's UCLA teams won four Pac-10 championships and tied for another while winning three Rose Bowls (1983, 1984, and 1986). He was the first person to participate in the Rose Bowl as a player, assistant coach and head coach. He compiled a record of 8–4–1 in bowl games and was the first coach to win a bowl game in seven consecutive seasons. The Bruins won four New Year's Day bowl games in a row from 1983 to 1986. However, they made just three bowl appearances in his last seven seasons, when their record was 43–35–1 after quarterback Troy Aikman graduated following the 1988 season. Donahue's record was 10–9–1 against USC. He was inducted into the College Football Hall of Fame in 2000. In 2015, Donahue lamented that he "quit too early" from UCLA. He had wanted the program to be more aggressive to pursue a national championship, but felt that unspecified differences with UCLA athletic officials hampered his effectiveness, prompting his departure.

In 1998, Donahue was offered an opportunity to coach in the NFL with the Dallas Cowboys. He would have re-united with Aikman. However, negotiations broke down with owner Jerry Jones, who instead hired Chan Gailey.

Broadcasting and executive career
Donahue was the lead college football analyst for CBS Sports from 1996 to 1998. He left CBS to join the San Francisco 49ers front office in 1999. He was hand-picked by Bill Walsh to succeed him as general manager. During his first two years in San Francisco, Donahue served as Walsh's director of player personnel. When Walsh retired in 2001, Donahue was elevated to the general manager position, which he held for four seasons. In his first two seasons, the 49ers were 22–10 under coach Steve Mariucci. However, the coach was fired after the 2002 season following a 31–6 loss to Tampa Bay in a divisional playoff game. Dennis Erickson was hired as his replacement, but he went 9–23 in two seasons, including a franchise-worst 2–14 in 2004. San Francisco faced salary cap issues during that span, prompting the break up of their playoff-caliber roster, while their high draft picks did not pan out. Donahue and Erickson were fired in January 2005.

In 2006, Donahue became a game analyst for the NFL on Fox and worked on their Bowl Championship Series coverage as well.  He served as an analyst on College Football Now on NFL Network. He was also an analyst for Dial Global.

Donahue helped found the California Showcase in 2013. The annual football combine provides high school seniors and junior college sophomores the opportunity to showcase their skills to college coaches from Division II, Division III and NAIA schools. He was also on the board of directors of the Lott IMPACT Trophy.

Personal life
Donahue met his wife, Andrea, on a blind date during his first year as a graduate assistant at the University of Kansas and her junior year as an undergraduate. They married two weeks after her graduation in 1969. They had three daughters and ten grandchildren.

On July 4, 2021, Donahue died at his home in Newport Beach, California, following a two-year battle with cancer. He was 77.

Awards and honors
Rose Bowl Hall of Fame (1997)
College Football Hall of Fame (2000)
UCLA Athletics Hall of Fame (2001)
Sun Bowl Hall of Fame (2005)
UCLA Alumnus of the Year (2008)
 The press box at the Rose Bowl was dedicated as the Terry Donahue Pavilion in 2013.
 Honorary Lott Trophy (2016)

Head coaching record

References

External links
 

1944 births
2021 deaths
American football defensive tackles
Coaches of American football from California
College football announcers
College Football Hall of Fame inductees
Deaths from cancer in California
Kansas Jayhawks football coaches
National Football League announcers
National Football League general managers
Notre Dame High School (Sherman Oaks, California) alumni
Players of American football from Los Angeles
San Francisco 49ers executives
UCLA Bruins football coaches
UCLA Bruins football players
Sports coaches from Los Angeles
Sportspeople from Los Angeles